Thinvent is a company creating Linux based firmware for thin clients. The company was founded in 2007. Thinvent's Thinux firmware is bundled by major manufacturers like VXL and HP with their thin clients. Thinvent also manufactures its own range of thin clients, called MicroClients.

Thinux OS
Thinux is a Thinvent's Embedded Linux environment for client side devices. It converts an x86 (VIA Nano, Intel Atom) or ARM architecture based thin client into a standalone computing device. It features a web based remote management and monitoring suite.

MicroClients
Thinvent manufactures both rebranded and self-engineered thin client models for the Indian market. It also designs and manufactures digital signage systems, kiosks, point of sale machines, and other embedded systems.

Solar Powered Computers
Thinvent designs and builds solar power supplies. These power supplies provide stable DC output that can be used to run computers and other electronics load.

Major Projects and customers
 Railway crew management in India
 Unreserved Ticketing System of Centre for Railway Information Systems
 Passenger Reservation System of Centre for Railway Information Systems

References

External links
 Thinvent Technologies' corporate website.
 Press coverage of Thinvent Technologies.
 Listing of Thinvent's Solar Computing product at the Digital Knowledge Center.

Thin clients